TER Limousin was the regional rail network serving Limousin région, France. In 2017, it was merged into the new TER Nouvelle-Aquitaine.

Network

By train

By bus
 Limoges – Uzerche – Tulle
 Limoges – Aubusson – Felletin
 Ussel – Felletin
 Ussel – Auzances – Montluçon
 Montluçon – Aubusson – Felletin
 La Souterraine – Guéret – Aubusson – Felletin

Rolling stock

Multiple units
 SNCF Class Z 7300
 SNCF Class X 2200
 SNCF Class X 2800
 SNCF Class X 72500
 SNCF Class X 73500
 SNCF Class B 81500

Buses
 Renault Tracer
 Renault Arès
 Irisbus Axer
 Irisbus Midys
 Indcar Mago 2
 Van Hool T 815 Alicron
 Setra S 315 GT

External links
 TER Limousin

 
TER